Better Than Sex: Confessions of a Political Junkie is a 1994 book written by American author and journalist Hunter S. Thompson. In Volume  IV of The Gonzo Papers series of books, Thompson details his reactions to the 1992 election of Bill Clinton as U.S. President, as well as recollects his own (unsuccessful) run for sheriff of Pitkin County, Colorado.

The book contains a number of magazine articles and other essays Thompson wrote about the Clinton election, but consists largely of faxes Thompson sent to various celebrities, politicians and journalists about the subject. It is the only volume in The Gonzo Papers to be composed of mostly new material.

Some copies are additionally subtitled Trapped Like a Rat in Mr. Bill's Neighborhood.

Essay collections by Hunter S. Thompson
1994 non-fiction books
Essay collections
Non-fiction books about elections
1992 United States presidential election
Books about politics of the United States